Joel Lassinantti (born January 8, 1993) is a Swedish professional ice hockey goaltender. He currently plays for Luleå HF in the Swedish Hockey League (SHL).

Playing career
Lassinantti previously played the entirety of his career within the Luleå HF organization of the Swedish Hockey League (SHL).

Following his 12th season within Luleå HF, Lassinantti opted to pursue a career away from SHL, agreeing to a one-year contract with Russian club, HC Sochi of the KHL on 16 May 2020. During the 2020–21 KHL season, after playing 15 KHL games, Lassinantti chose to return to Sweden and Luleå HF.

References

External links

1993 births
Living people
Almtuna IS players
Asplöven HC players
Luleå HF players
HC Sochi players
Swedish ice hockey goaltenders
People from Luleå
Sportspeople from Norrbotten County